Sharington Talbot (1656-85), of Lacock Abbey, Wiltshire, was an English Member of Parliament.

He was a Member (MP) of the Parliament of England for Chippenham in 1685.

References

1656 births
1685 deaths
17th-century English people
People from Wiltshire
Members of the Parliament of England (pre-1707)